Roger Harding may refer to:
 Roger Harding (American football)
 Roger Harding (singer)